The men's 4x100 metres relay event at the 1996 World Junior Championships in Athletics was held in Sydney, Australia, at International Athletic Centre on 25 August.

Medalists

Results

Final
25 August

Heats
25 August

Heat 1

Heat 2

Heat 3

Participation
According to an unofficial count, 69 athletes from 17 countries participated in the event.

References

4 x 100 metres relay
Relays at the World Athletics U20 Championships